Aashiq Abu (born 12 April 1978) is an Indian film director, producer, actor, and distributor, who works in Malayalam cinema.
He is best known for his films such as Daddy Cool (2009), Salt N' Pepper (2011), 22 Female Kottayam (2012), Idukki Gold (2013), Mayaanadhi (2017) and Virus (2019). Abu is often known for his collaboration with screenwriters Syam Pushkaran and Dileesh Nair.

Abu produces and distributes under the banner OPM and OPM Dream Mill Cinemas. OPM produced Dileesh Pothan's directional debut Maheshinte Prathikaaram (2016), which won the National Film Award for Best Feature Film in Malayalam.

Personal life
Aashiq Abu was born in Edappally, Kerala to C. M. Abu, and Jameela Abu. Aashiq Abu completed his school education from SRV High School, Kochi. As a pre-degree  student at Maharajas College, he was elected to the Students' Union, and was a union member for four consecutive years.
He married actress Rima Kallingal on 1 November 2013, in a simple function held in Kakkanad Registration office, Kochi.

Aashiq Abu has been part of Anbodu Kochi, a Facebook-based group which works with the local administration, collecting and distributing relief materials in the aftermath of natural disasters. In 2019 November, Kochi Music Foundation of which Aashiq Abu is a part of organised a musical event 'Karuna' in Kochi promising that the proceedings from the event will be donated to the Chief Minister's Disaster Relief Fund (CMDRF) to help flood victims. There was delay in Chief Minister's office receiving the funds, sparking a controversy.

Film career
After working  as an assistant director to Malayalam film director Kamal for about five years, Abu made his directorial debut with Daddy Cool in 2009 starring Mammootty. Salt N' Pepper was his second directorial effort. Salt N' Pepper’s Tamil, Telugu and Hindi remake rights was bought by actor-director Prakash Raj. In 2012, he directed 22 Female Kottayam which was followed by Da Thadiya, Gangster and Rani Padmini. Aashiq Abu has also done a short film, Lost in Bangalore for Mathrubhumi. His 2017 release was Mayaanadhi. On June 7th 2019, his latest movie Virus was released. The movie is based on the true events of the Nipah virus outbreak in Kerala in 2018.

Ad films

Aashiq Abu has done ad films for Joyalukkas group, Mathrubhumi, Panasonic, Lulu Group, Dubai Gold and Jewellery Group, Media One TV and Club 7. OPM (Original Pixels in Motion) Cinemas led by Aashiq Abu is a production house launched in October 2012. In 2015, Aashiq Abu had been hired by UAE Exchange to direct their ad campaign starring Malayalam actors Jayasurya and Fahadh Faasil.

Filmography

As actor

Awards

References

External links
 

1978 births
Malayalam film directors
Living people
Maharaja's College, Ernakulam alumni
Film directors from Kochi
Film producers from Kochi
Indian male film actors
Male actors in Malayalam cinema
21st-century Indian male actors
Male actors from Kochi
21st-century Indian film directors
Indian film distributors